The 2014 Coleman Vision Tennis Championships was a professional tennis tournament played on outdoor hard courts. It was the seventeenth edition of the tournament which was part of the 2014 ITF Women's Circuit, offering a total of $75,000 in prize money. It took place in Albuquerque, New Mexico, United States, on 15–21 September 2014.

Singles main draw entrants

Seeds 

 1 Rankings as of 8 September 2014

Other entrants 
The following players received wildcards into the singles main draw:
  Lauren Embree
  Nicole Vaidišová
  Caitlin Whoriskey
  Allie Will

The following players received entry from the qualifying draw:
  Tornado Alicia Black
  Sofia Kenin
  Petra Rampre
  Ashley Weinhold

The following player received an entry by a lucky loser spot:
  Tori Kinard

Champions

Singles 

  Anna Tatishvili def.  Irina Falconi, 6–2, 6–4

Doubles 

  Jan Abaza /  Melanie Oudin def.  Nicole Melichar /  Allie Will, 6–2, 6–3

External links 
 2014 Coleman Vision Tennis Championships at ITFtennis.com
 Official website

 
2014
2014 ITF Women's Circuit
Hard court tennis tournaments in the United States
2014 in American tennis
September 2014 sports events in the United States